Prof. Franco B. Ascani (born 15 March 1943) is an Italian businessman and sports manager. He is the current President of the FICTS (Federation Internationale Cinema Television Sportifs), President of the UESpT – Union Européenne Sport pour Tous and Director of the Master in Sport Management, Marketing & Society program at the University of Milano-Bicocca.

He is a Member (the only Italian) of the Culture and Olympic Heritage Commission.

Recognition 
 1978 he has been awarded, by Sandro Pertini (former-Italian Republic President, of the title of the “Republic Knight”. 
 1978 “Star of bronze to the sport merit of the NOC” (Giulio Onesti President). 
 1983 “Star of silver to the sport merit of the NOC”. (Franco Carraro President).
 1983 “Oak to the merit of 1st degree” of the Federatletica (Primo Nebiolo President). 
 1987 “Oak to the merit of 2nd degree” of Federatletica (Primo Nebiolo President). 
 1989 “Gold Ambrogino”, official merit of the Municipality of Milan. 
 1989 “Silver Plate” IAAF for the World Marathon Cup. 
 1991 “Biscione d’oro” from APT Milano 
 1995 “Follaro d’oro internazionale” for the Cinema and the sport Television. 
 1996 “Guirlande d' Honneur” for the sports Cinema and TV  
 1997 “Diploma of Honour” of the Olympic International Academy 
 2001 “IOC Award” for Voluntary service Year” (Juan A. Samaranch President). 
 2004 “International Olympic Committee Award” (Olympic Games Athens) 
 2005 “USSI Plate” - “The gold pen of the sport” 
 2007 “Oak to the Merit of 3rd degree” of the Federatletica (Franco Arese President). 
 2010 “Star of Gold to the sport merit of the Italian NOC” (Gianni Petrucci President). 
 2011 “Gold Medal” by Province of Milano  
 2013 “Gianni Brera Award” 
 2014 “Diploma of Excellent Press Office” by National Journalist Federation 
 2015 “Honorary Degree” with the title of “International Honorary Doctorate” in Philosopia by the USSA - United States Sports Academy, America's Sports University, the most important Master Sport Academy of United States of America.

References 

1943 births
Living people
Italian businesspeople